Anger is a Gift is a young adult novel by Mark Oshiro, published  May 22, 2018 by Tor Teen.

Despite their youth, the students decide to organize and push back against the administration. When tensions hit a fever pitch and tragedy strikes, Moss must face a difficult choice: give in to fear and hate or realize that anger can actually be a gift.

Reception 
Anger is a Gift received starred reviews from School Library Journal and Kirkus, as well as positive reviews from The Bulletin of the Center for Children's Books and Publishers Weekly.

School Library Journal called the book "[p]art sweet love story, part social justice commentary," stating that "this title begs to be read and discussed. There are no good models of white ally-ship, and the title is stronger for this fact. In the same vein, the diversity of this title also makes it shine: sexual orientation, gender identity, religion, race, and ethnicity are all portrayed in Oshiro's inner-city Oakland setting."

Kirkus called it "[a] masterful debut rich with intersectional nuance and grass-roots clarity."

Anger is a Gift has received the following accolades:

Schneider Family Book Award for Teens (2019)
 Lambda Literary Award for LGBTQ Children's/Young Adult nominee (2019)

The book has also been included on the following "best of" lists:

 Kirkus Reviews''' Best Books of 2018
 Buzzfeed's 24 Best YA Books of 2018
 Vulture's 38 Best LGBTQ YA Novels
 Book Riot'''s Best Books 2018

References 

Tor Books books
Novels set in Oakland, California
American LGBT novels
2018 children's books